Camelot Music was a mall-based American retailer of prerecorded music and accessories and was one of the largest music retailers in the United States based on store count.

As of May 31, 1998, the company operated 455 stores in 37 states nationwide under two brand names: Camelot Music and The Wall. Camelot Music was founded in 1956 in Massillon, Ohio, by Paul David and his brother Robert David. It operated 305 stores with a significant store base concentration in the Midwest and Southeast regions of the United States. The Wall operated 150 stores primarily in the Mid-Atlantic and Northeast regions of the United States.

The company acquired certain assets of The Wall, formerly owned by British company WHSmith, effective February 28, 1998.  Around this same time, Camelot acquired South Florida retailer Spec's Music.The Wall was best known for its trademark "Lifetime Music Guarantee", which offered free replacements for cassettes and CDs that had been damaged in any way. They were also notable for allowing customers to listen to CDs before buying them, and for their "Repeat Performer" customer card program, where 20 card punches earned a free CD or cassette tape.

In late 1998, Camelot was acquired by Trans World Entertainment, which later consolidated all of its mall-based music stores under the brand name FYE, including the remaining Camelot and The Wall locations.

Background/overview 
Camelot Music Incorporated was founded in 1956 by Paul David in Massillon, Ohio and was considered by many industrial experts to be the third largest and a highly regarded specialty retailer store of recorded music. Experts view Camelot’s business strategy as a very aggressive and fastmoving approach where a large focus or emphasis was placed upon the merging and acquisition of music retailers across the U.S.A increasing its reach and expanding their customer base. Geographically, Camelot focused its store base around the Midwest and Southeast regions of the United States while another acquired record company “The Wall” was focused in the Northeast and Mid-Atlantic regions of the United States. As of the start of the 1999 financial year, the organisation operated 455 stores nationwide across 37 U.S States under Camelot and their subsidiary The Wall.

Early beginnings 

Camelot Inc was established in 1956 by Paul David and in 1965 opened its first retail store in North Canton, Ohio with another store opening in the Mellett Mall (now Canton Centre) a few months later. Camelot specialised in the sales of pre-recorded music especially vinyl LP, 45-rpm records, cassette tapes, compact disks (CD’s) and video/music accessories. While Camelot focused on being situated primarily in shopping centres or malls, diversified into free standing locations and music departments in leased spaces located in large discount stores.

Founder and early inspirations 
Paul David founded and owned Camelot Inc in 1956 until it was acquired by Investcorp in 1993 (an International Investment Bank based in Bahrain). Paul David is one of thirteen siblings born to an immigrant Lebanese family and worked initially as a sales representative. He ventured to work as an independent retail store shelf stacker, stocking vinyl LP and 45 rpm records in low density local stores such as pharmacies, variety, groceries and specialty stores. Then later expanded on towards stocking larger retailers and groceries including W.T. Grant, F.W. Woolworth and S.S. Kresge.  Following this business venture, David opened his first retail store at Mellett Mall in 1965 followed by the successful expansion of Camelot Inc across the United States and the acquisitions of several other retailer music stores.

At 70 years of age in 1993, David sold his company to Investcorp and established the Paul & Carol Foundation with his wife. The foundation seeks to serve the needs of underprivileged youth by providing scholarship opportunities to over 300 high school students. Further to this, David founded and financially invested in the Massillon Tiger Football Program in 1983. On the 2nd November 2002, David passed away at 79 years of age following a brief illness and was buried at St Joseph’s Cemetery with Rev. Raymond Paul conducting the burial mass and ceremony.

Further expansions and acquisition 
Initially starting out with opening their first mall-based retail store in Canton, Ohio in 1965, Camelot Inc further expanded its number of stores geographically in the Midwest and Southeast region. Camelot intensified its efforts and geographic reach by the acquisition of other record retailer chains, including the California-based Rainbow Records in 1990, and Philadelphia-based music retailer Record World in 1992.  Furthermore, Camelot entered a corporate agreement to buy some of the holdings of Wee Three Records, a UK-owned chain that had gone bankrupt - specifically, six additional stores and the inventory from several more.

In 1993, the company owned a total of 360 stores across the United States and later in the year, founder Paul David stepped down as CEO, turning the position to COO of Camelot James Bonk and sold his majority holdings of Camelot Inc to Investcorp through a stock swap. Stock or equity based swaps have been a common strategy for companies to obtain majority control over companies. Following Investcorp’s acquisition of Camelot, they acquired Hastings Music & Books and the Cavages music retailers. In 1998, Camelot Inc acquired Philadelphia based record and music retailer The Wall, taking over 153 of their mid-Atlantic chain-based stores.  The Wall was known to by their customers for their Loyalty programs, to listen to music before purchasing it and exchange any of their damaged cassettes and CD’s for free.

Later on in 1998 Camelot merged with a Florida based music retailer, Spec’s Music. In October 1998, Trans World Entertainment, a video and music retailer, acquired Camelot Inc alongside its acquired companies The Wall and The Spec’s for a stock swap valued approximately $427 million. Trans World Entertainment later rebranded the entirety of their music retailer-based stores to FYE with the initials standing for “For Your Entertainment”. FYE continues its operations as a music retailer both online and in stores around the United States.

Bankruptcy and post-administrative operations 
As a consequence of the changing nature of work alongside Investcorp’s leveraged buyout of Camelot Inc from David the company found itself closing a number of its stores, laying off staff and eventually lead to filing a Chapter 11 Bankruptcy Protection Agreement. The Chapter 11 Plan allowed the company to operate continually at a loss, so as to pay off creditors.

References

Music retailers of the United States
Defunct retail companies of the United States
Retail companies established in 1956
1956 establishments in Ohio
Companies that filed for Chapter 11 bankruptcy in 1996